Rolf Wiik (30 January 1929 – 9 August 2007) was a Finnish épée fencer. He competed at the 1952, 1956 and 1960 Summer Olympics.

References

1929 births
2007 deaths
Finnish male épée fencers
Olympic fencers of Finland
Fencers at the 1952 Summer Olympics
Fencers at the 1956 Summer Olympics
Fencers at the 1960 Summer Olympics
Sportspeople from Tampere
20th-century Finnish people
21st-century Finnish people